, there were 266 electric vehicles (not including plug-in hybrid vehicles) registered in North Dakota. , 0.44% of all new light-duty vehicles sold in the state were electric.

In 2022, North Dakota was ranked by Forbes Advisor as the best state in the United States for electric vehicle ownership.

Government policy
, the state government does not offer any tax incentives for electric vehicle purchases.

Charging stations
, there were 58 public charging stations in North Dakota.

The Infrastructure Investment and Jobs Act, signed into law in November 2021, allocates  to charging stations in North Dakota.

, the state government recognizes I-29 and I-94 as "alternative fuel corridors" with plans for charging stations to be built every .

By region

Bismarck–Mandan
, there were two public charging stations in the Bismarck–Mandan metropolitan area.

Fargo
, there were around 20 public charging stations in Fargo.

References

North Dakota
Road transportation in North Dakota